Ator 2 – L'invincibile Orion ("Ator 2: Orion the Invincible"), a.k.a. English title: The Blade Master) is a 1982 Italian sword-and-sandal film directed by Joe D'Amato, and starring Miles O'Keeffe as Ator, Charles Borromel as Akronos, Lisa Foster as Mila, the daughter of Akronos, and David Brandon as Zor.

Plot 
Akronos has discovered the Geometric Nucleus during the course of his research. The Nucleus is a device of incredible power that could be a terrible weapon. Akronos feels that the Nucleus must be kept from evil men at all costs. When he learns that the evil Zor and his army are approaching his castle, he asks his daughter Mila to bring his former student Ator back to help defeat Zor. Mila runs away to find Ator. Zor's soldiers enter and begin beating Akronos, but Zor angrily sends them away to maintain the image of a man who would only use violence if needed.

Mila is pursued by Zor's soldiers and is wounded by them but continues to stagger towards Ator's home. At last, she arrives, and Ator uses his medical knowledge to heal her wound. She then is able to convince him she is the daughter of Akronos, and that her father is in terrible danger.

Mila, Ator, and Ator's Asian assistant Thong begin the journey back to Akronos' castle, facing various dangers along the way, including a group of cannibals, another group determined to sacrifice them to their god — which is a huge snake — and other soldiers.

Finally, they make it back to the castle. While Mila and Thong sneak in the back way, Ator uses his knowledge of flight to quickly create a hang glider, which he flies over the castle, dropping bombs on Zor's soldiers. Having defeated most of Zor's forces, Ator takes on Zor himself and defeats him. Akronos convinces Ator to let Zor live to face trial, but when Ator steps away, Zor grabs a sword to threaten Ator, and Zor is killed by Thong.

Afterward, Akronos gives the Geometric Nucleus to Ator. Ator tells Mila he has to leave, that his life is too dangerous to share with her. Mila says that she knows Ator must fight evil where ever it occurs. Ator leaves Thong behind to help take care of Mila and Akronos, and leaves. He takes the Nucleus to a distant land, where he destroys it in a massive nuclear detonation.

Cast
 Miles O'Keeffe as Ator
 Lisa Foster as Mila
 Charles Borromel as Akronos
 Chen Wong as Thong, Ator's teacher
 David Brandon (credited as David Cain Haughton) as Zor
 Nancy Hall as 1st maiden
 Linette Ray as 2nd maiden
 Sandra Carle as Old woman
 Osiride Peverello as Sadur
 Nello Pazzafini as Warrior captain
 Salvatore Baccaro as Caveman
 Tricia Pettitt as Cavewoman

Production
In early 1983, a few months after Ator, the Fighting Eagle was a commercial success, D'Amato embarked on a new project, casting Miles O'Keeffe again as the lead and Lisa Foster as his partner. D'Amato and scriptwriter José Maria Sanchez, who had already worked on the first Ator film, prepared a prehistoric film in the vein of the successful Academy Award-winning French film Quest for Fire (1981). The working title was Adamo ed Eva. According to D'Amato, when everything was ready for the shoot and rehearsals had already begun, Miles O'Keeffe backed out for religious and moral reasons. Mark Gregory played the lead role in Adamo ed Eva.

O'Keeffe starred in Ator 2 instead. D'Amato commented that "Ator 2 was made in great haste and almost without a script", and includes footage from the first Ator film in the form of flashbacks. D'Amato said they made it "to take advantage of a contract we had with Miles O'Keefe".

Release

Italy
According to Kinnard & Crnkovich, the film was released in Italy on December 16, 1982, while Michele Giordano states that filming only began in early 1983 and both Michele Giordano and Roberto Poppi maintain that the film was never theatrically released in Italy. On VHS, it was released by Eureka Video as Ator l'invincibile, which is the cinematic title of the first part.

United States
Ator 2 was released in the United States as The Blade Master on February 15, 1984 with a 92 minute running time. The film was shown on American television under the title The Cave Dwellers, a version of the film that included footage from the film Taur the Mighty.

Other countries
The film has also been released under the titles Ator the Invincible (Great Britain), Ator II - Der Unbesiegbare (Germany), and both Ator, el invencible and Ator 2, el invencible (Spain).

Reception and legacy
Total Film included Ator 2 – L'invincibile Orion in their list of the 66 worst films of all time.

In its Cave Dwellers TV version (sold by Film Ventures International), the film was parodied as the third season premiere of Mystery Science Theater 3000.

References

Sources

External links 
 
 MST3K treatment on ShoutFactoryTV

1984 films
1984 fantasy films
Ator
Italian sequel films
Sword and sorcery films
1980s Italian-language films
English-language Italian films
1980s English-language films
Films directed by Joe D'Amato
Films scored by Carlo Rustichelli
1980s rediscovered films
1984 multilingual films
Italian multilingual films